The 2003 Meath Senior Football Championship was the 111th edition of the Meath GAA's premier club Gaelic football tournament for senior graded teams in County Meath, Ireland, and also the 50th anniversary of the first use of the Keegan Cup, won by Navan O'Mahonys first in 1954. The tournament consists of 16 teams, with the winner going on to represent Meath in the Leinster Senior Club Football Championship. The championship starts with a group stage and then progresses to a knock out stage.  
 
Dunshaughlin were the defending champions after they defeated Trim in the previous years final, but their quest to claim 4 S.F.C. titles in succession was thwarted by Blackhall Gaels in the semi-final.

This was Ballivor's first season in the top grade since 1986 after claiming the 2002 Meath Intermediate Football Championship title, their second Intermediate win, but were relegated later on in the year, spending only 1 year as a senior club.

On 21 September 2003, Blackhall Gaels claimed their 12th Senior Championship title when they defeated Simonstown Gaels 2-9 to 1-9. Steven Nally lifted the Keegan Cup for the Batterstown/Kilcloon combination while Anthony Moyles claimed the 'Man of the Match' award.

Team changes
The following teams have changed division since the 2002 championship season.

To S.F.C.
Promoted from I.F.C.
 Ballivor  -  (Intermediate Champions)

From S.F.C.
Relegated to I.F.C.
 Oldcastle

Group stage
There are 2 groups called Group A and B. The 4 top finishers in Group A and B will qualify for the quarter finals. The 2 teams that finish last in their groups will play in a relegation play off.

Group A

Round 1:
 St. Patrick's 1-12, 2-6 Trim, Skryne,
 Dunshaughlin 2-12, 0-11 Summerhill, Dunsany,
 Walterstown 1-12, 0-9 Cortown, Pairc Tailteann,
 St. Peter's Dunboyne 1-12, 1-11 Kilmainhamwood, Pairc Tailteann,

Round 2:
 Trim 1-15, 1-10 Summerhill, Pairc Tailteann,
 Kilmainhamwood 2-6, 0-6 St. Patrick's, Rathkenny,
 Walterstown 0-10, 1-5 Dunshaughlin,
 St. Peter's Dunboyne 2-10, 0-7 Cortown, Pairc Tailteann,

Round 3:
 Trim 1-11, 0-12 Kilmainhamwood,
 St. Patrick's 4-13, 1-10 Cortown, Walterstown,
 Dunshaughlin 1-12, 1-8 St. Peter's Dunboyne,
 Walterstown 0-11, 0-9 Summerhill, Trim,

Round 4:
 Trim 0-11, 0-6 Cortown, Kildalkey,
 Dunshaughlin 1-8, 3-2 St. Patrick's Duleek,
 Summerhill 2-7, 0-11 Kilmainhamwood, Moynalty,
 St. Peter's Dunboyne 0-14, 0-11 Walterstown,

Round 5:
 Walterstown 2-15, 2-8 St. Patrick's, Skryne,
 Trim 1-12, 1-8 Dunshaughlin,
 Cortown 1-10, 0-10 Kilmainhamwood, Moynalty,
 St. Peter's Dunboyne 2-10, 2-3 Summerhill, Dunsany,

Round 6:
 Trim 1-11, 1-7 Walterstown,
 St. Patrick's 3-12, 1-7 St. Peter's Dunboyne, Donaghmore,
 Dunshaughlin 4-13, 1-8 Kilmainhamwood, Simonstown,
 Summerhill 2-12, 1-10 Cortown,

Round 7:
 Trim 1-10, 0-12 St. Peter's Dunboyne,
 St. Patrick's 0-11, 0-10 Summerhill, Dunsany,
 Dunshaughlin 1-7, 0-10 Cortown, Pairc Tailteann,
 Walterstown 1-8, 1-7 Kilmainhamwood, Kells,

Group B

Round 1:
 Blackhall Gaels 1-9, 1-8 Simonstown Gaels, Skryne,
 Skryne 1-13, 0-13 Ballinlough,
 Dunderry 1-14, 2-3 Ballivor, Athboy,
 Seneschalstown 2-10, 0-12 Gaeil Colmcille, Walterstown,

Round 2:
 Blackhall Gaels 2-11, 2-2 Seneschalstown, Dunsany,
 Simonstown Gaels 3-10, 1-4 Ballivor, Trim,
 Skryne 1-13, 0-6 Gaeil Colmcille,
 Dunderry 1-12, 0-4 Ballinlough, Athboy,

Round 3:
 Skryne 1-14, 1-8 Blackhall Gaels, Pairc Tailteann,
 Seneschalstown 1-14, 0-7 Simonstown Gaels, Pairc Tailteann,
 Dunderry 1-10, 0-10 Gaeil Colmcille, Athboy,
 Ballinlough 1-12, 1-6 Ballivor,

Round 4:
 Blackhall Gaels 2-10, 0-4 Dunderry,
 Simonstown Gaels 0-11, 1-5 Ballinlough,
 Gaeil Colmcille 1-9, 0-6 Ballivor,
 Skryne 0-13, 0-11 Seneschalstown, Pairc Tailteann,

Round 5:
 Blackhall Gaels 0-8, 0-7 Ballivor,
 Skryne 0-16, 0-11 Simonstown Gaels,
 Gaeil Colmcille 0-11, 1-8 Ballinlough,
 Dunderry 3-11, 1-9 Seneschalstown, Pairc Tailteann,

Round 6:
 Blackhall Gaels 1-15, 0-6 Ballinlough, Trim,
 Simonstown Gaels 2-11, 0-7 Gaeil Colmcille, Martry,
 Skryne 2-10, 1-9 Dunderry, Pairc Tailteann,
 Ballivor 4-7 2-11 Seneschalstown, Dunsany,

Round 7:
 Blackhall Gaels 3-22, 0-2 Gaeil Colmcille, Pairc Tailteann,
 Simonstown Gaels 2-12, 0-7 Dunderry, Pairc Tailteann,
 Skryne 1-12, 1-8 Ballivor,
 Seneschalstown 0-10, 0-7 Ballinlough, Martry,

Knock-out Stage

Relegation final
 Kilmainhamwood 1-8, 0-8 Ballivor, Kells, 6/9/2003,

Finals

Quarter-final:
 Blackhall Gaels 0-9, 0-9 St. Patrick's, Skryne, 22/8/2003, 
 Dunshaughlin 3-8, 1-12 Skryne, Pairc Tailteann,  22/8/2003,
 Trim 0-14, 0-8 Dunderry, Pairc Tailteann,  24/8/2003,
 Simonstown Gaels 1-11, 0-11 Walterstown, Pairc Tailteann,  24/8/2003,

Quarter-final Replay:
 Blackhall Gaels 4-7, 1-8 St. Patrick's, Skryne, 31/8/2003,

Semi-final:
 Blackhall Gaels 3-9, 1-12 Dunshaughlin, Pairc Tailteann, 7/9/2003,
 Simonstown Gaels 1-9, 0-8 Trim, Pairc Tailteann, 7/9/2003,

Final:
 Blackhall Gaels 1-9, 0-7 Simonstown Gaels, Pairc Tailteann, 21/9/2003,

References

External links

Meath Senior Football Championship
Meath Senior Football Championship